The 1970 New Hampshire Wildcats football team was an American football team that represented the University of New Hampshire as a member of the Yankee Conference during the 1970 NCAA College Division football season. In its third year under head coach Jim Root, the team compiled a 5–3 record (3–2 against conference opponents) and tied for third place in the Yankee Conference.

Schedule

References

New Hampshire
New Hampshire Wildcats football seasons
New Hampshire Wildcats football